Hazleton Regional Airport  is a public airport two miles northwest of Hazleton, in Luzerne County, Pennsylvania.

The airport had Air Pennsylvania flights to Philadelphia; Allegheny Airlines stopped there from 1957 until Allegheny Commuter took over in 1968.

Facilities
Its single runway, 10/28, is 4,898 by 100 feet (1,493 x 30 m) asphalt.

In the year ending October 21, 2008 the airport had 23,942 aircraft operations, average 65 per day: 99% general aviation and 1% military. 42 aircraft were then based at the airport: 86% single-engine, 2% multi-engine, 5% jet and 7% helicopter.

References

External links 
 Aerial photo as of 13 April 1999 from USGS The National Map
 

Airports in Pennsylvania
Transportation buildings and structures in Luzerne County, Pennsylvania
Hazleton, Pennsylvania